Church End may refer to one of several hamlets in Hertfordshire, England:

Church End, East Hertfordshire, in the parish of Little Hadham
Church End, North Hertfordshire, in the parish of Weston
Church End, Redbourn
Church End, Three Rivers, in the parish of Sarratt